was a Japanese field hockey player who competed in the 1932 Summer Olympics. He was born in Hamhung, Korea. In 1932 he was a member of the Japanese field hockey team, which won the silver medal. He played two matches as forward.

References

External links
 
Kenichi Konishi's profile at databaseOlympics.com
Kenichi Konishi's profile at Sports Reference.com

1909 births
1986 deaths
People from Hamhung
Japanese male field hockey players
Olympic field hockey players of Japan
Field hockey players at the 1932 Summer Olympics
Olympic silver medalists for Japan
Olympic medalists in field hockey
Medalists at the 1932 Summer Olympics
20th-century Japanese people